Astro hitz, formerly known as HITZ.TV was a Malaysian music video channel provided by Astro. It made its début on 20 October 2003 and serves as a visual entertainment complement of hitz.fm, which is under Astro's radio management arm, AMP Radio Networks (now Astro Radio). Before the channel renumbering on 1 October 2007, the channel broadcasts on channel 16, while broadcasting on channel 705 when the channel renumbering takes effect.

The channel relaunched with its new name in April 2009.

MeleTOP are selected on Astro Ria and Astro Maya HD also aired on Astro hitz for repeat on Wednesday.

Due to declining popularity of the channel and after 13 years of broadcasting, Astro hitz ceased broadcasting on 16 May 2016.

Programming

Programming by 2012-2016
 MELETOP

Programming by 2011-2016
 K-Pop Hitz
 K-Pop Hitz Talent Show
 The Music Video Grant

Programming by 2009-2016
 Shot by Shot
 Homeboyz
 Asian Potion
 Shot by Shot
 Riffs
 Front Seat
 Hitz Soulfood
 Alt_Hitz
 Elements 4 Elements
 Junk Disco
 Music Factory
 Out & About
 Fresh Vibes
 Club hitz
 Spin Master
 Hitz Dosage
 Best Of British

Programming by 2003-2009
 Test Tube
 On The Spot
 Holla!
 AlternaHitz
 A+
 Club Hitz
 Rock Hitz
 Bak 2 Bak Hitz
 Hitz Special
 UVJ
 Hitz Shoutout
 Hot30hitz
 Malaysian English Top 10
 chat space
 L8nite
 UP2U

Unaired programming
 Video DJ

Note: As of May 2016, all programs and music videos shown were repeats. However, the repeats of Malay content that was previously broadcast on other channels has attracted criticism on social media as a large part of music content has been replaced by repeated Malay programs.

VJs
 Adam Carruthers
 Serena Choong (2003-2009)
 Natalie Kniese
 Tengku Ean Mohd Nasrun
 Isabelle Zhen
 Alexis Sue-Ann

References

External links
 Hitz.fm website

Astro Malaysia Holdings television channels
Music television channels
Television channels and stations established in 2003
Television channels and stations disestablished in 2016
Music organisations based in Malaysia